Seaman, a Newfoundland dog, was a member of the Lewis and Clark Expedition, the first trip from the Mississippi River to the Pacific coast and back. He was the only animal to complete the entire three-year trip.

Seaman was purchased in 1803 specifically for the expedition by Captain Meriwether Lewis, while he was in Pittsburgh, Pennsylvania, awaiting completion of the boats for the voyage. Working dogs, strong and easy to handle—Lewis describes Seaman as "docile"—, he chose a Newfoundland because they do well on boats, are good swimmers, and can assist in water rescues. His name reflects this.

There is no explicit description of Seaman's color or appearance. He is nowadays universally depicted as black or dark brown, the colors of most modern Newfoundlands, but a survey by an art historian of the breed as it was depicted in paintings of the early nineteenth century found "not a single all-black [that] was called a Newfoundland". "In fact, all the early 19th century illustrations which I have found, and whose color I could authenticate[,] were white with black or dark areas and frecklings."

Seaman on the expedition
Seaman did many things to help the explorers, and they became fond of him. He was "our dog".

He also retrieved geese and deer, and once killed and retrieved an antelope swimming across a river.

According to Lewis and Clark's report, some Native Americans were impressed by the dog's "sagacity" (wisdom, obedience); they had never seen such a big dog. The dog "patrolled all night" to warn of bears, and once had to drive off a buffalo in their camp while the men slept.

A modern commentator on the Expedition remarked that "Lewis seems to have been happiest when he was alone on shore with his gun, his notebook, and his dog Seaman."

During the expedition, around May 14, 1805, Captains Meriwether Lewis and William Clark performed surgery on one of Seaman's arteries in his hind leg that had been severed by a beaver bite. In early 1806, as the expedition was beginning the return journey, Seaman was stolen by Indians and Lewis sent three men to retrieve the dog.  Lewis and Clark's Corps of Discovery ate over 200 dogs, bought from the Indians, while traveling the Lewis and Clark Trail, in addition to their horses, but Seaman was spared.

The final reference to Seaman in the expedition journals, recorded by Lewis on July 15, 1806, states that "[T]he musquetoes continue to infest us in such manner that we can scarcely exist... My dog even howls with the torture he experiences from them."

Seaman after the expedition
Seaman survived the expedition, and Lewis took the dog home with him to St. Louis. He is reported to have refused food and died of grief after Lewis's premature death. According to a contemporary historian:

According to the same historian, in 1814 Seaman's collar was in an Alexandria, D.C., museum and bore the inscription:

The mistaken name "Scannon"

Due to a transcription error in Lewis' journals, the dog was once thought to have been named Scannon. However, during Donald Jackson's 1984 study of Lewis and Clark place-names in Montana—every expedition member got something named after him—he found that Lewis had named a tributary of the Blackfoot River Seaman’s Creek (now Monture Creek) and concluded that the true name of the dog was "Seaman".

Honors
In 2008, Seaman became the official mascot of Lewis & Clark College's Pioneers. He was proposed unsuccessfully for State Historical Dog of Missouri.

Monuments to or including Seaman:
 A  bronze sculpture of Meriweather Lewis accompanied by Seaman, "Lewis the Naturalist", by Chinese-American sculptor Kwan Wu, was reported in 2000 to have been on permanent display at the White House. It was located in the hall just outside the room where Lewis and President Jefferson often ate meals.
 A tablet, similar to a tombstone, stands in front of the Custom House in Cairo, Illinois. link
 At the National Quilt Museum in Paducah, Kentucky, sculptor George Lundeen (William Clark once owned the land the museum is on.)
 In front of the Missouri State Capitol, Jefferson City, Missouri
 Case Park in Kansas City, Missouri
 Fort Atkinson State Historical Park in Fort Calhoun, Nebraska. It is the site of Lewis and Clark's first contact with Native Americans, and the monument includes statues of them in addition to Lewis, Clark, and Seaman.
 A carved wood statue, "Capt. Lewis and Seaman", is located in Gladstone Park, Wausa, Nebraska.
  Lewis and Clark Interpretive Center in Sioux City, Iowa
 A steel,  statue of Seaman looks over the Missouri River at Fort Mandan, near the North Dakota Lewis and Clark Interpretive Center, Washburn, North Dakota. Sculptor is Tom Neary.
 Milltown, Montana, sculptor Jim Rogers
 Overlook Park and the Lewis and Clark National Historical Interpretative Center, both in Great Falls, Montana, sculptor Joe Halko
 Fort Clatsop National Memorial in Seaside, Oregon. There is a separate reference to a statue of Lewis, Clark, and Seaman at The Turnaround in Seaside.
 Cascade Locks Marine Park in Cascade Locks, Oregon
 Columbia View Park, behind the Columbia County Courthouse, in Saint Helens, Oregon
 Seaman Dog Park, part of the Sacagawea Interpretative, Cultural, & Educational Center in Salmon, Idaho.
 Other monuments and statues that include Seaman can be found in St. Louis, Missouri, St. Charles, Missouri, Lincoln, Nebraska, and Washougal, Washington.

See also
 List of individual dogs

Creative literature about Seaman

Children's books about Seaman (by date)

References

Further reading

Teaching material
 The Seaman Expedition: The Corps of Discovery through the Eyes of Meriwether Lewis’s Dog, Seaman Frontier Army Museum, Fort Leavenworth, KS.

External links
Pages on Seaman from lewis-clark.org.

Individual dogs
Lewis and Clark Expedition
Lewis and Clark Expedition people